Timothy Gettinger (born April 14, 1998) is an American professional ice hockey forward for the Hartford Wolf Pack of the American Hockey League (AHL) as a prospect to the New York Rangers of the National Hockey League (NHL). He was selected by the Rangers in the fifth round, 141st overall, in the 2016 NHL Entry Draft. He had served as captain for the Sault Ste. Marie Greyhounds of the Ontario Hockey League (OHL).

Playing career
Gettinger first played midget hockey in Cleveland with the Barons. In his first season with the Sault Ste. Marie Greyhounds of the Ontario Hockey League (OHL) in the 2014–15 season, Gettinger scored 10 goals. In the second season with the Greyhounds, his totals improved to 17 goals and 39 points in 60 games for the 2015–16 season.

On June 24, 2016, Gettinger was selected 141st overall by the New York Rangers during the 2016 NHL Entry Draft. Gettinger entered the draft as the 65th ranked prospect.

On March 16, 2017, the Rangers signed Gettinger to a three-year, entry-level contract.

On October 12, 2017, Gettinger was named captain of the Sault Ste. Marie Greyhounds.

Gettinger began the 2018–19 season with the Hartford Wolf Pack of the American Hockey League (AHL). He was recalled by the Rangers due to an injury to forward Mats Zuccarello on November 23, 2018, and played his first NHL game the next day with the Rangers. He was returned to Harford after playing one game, only to be recalled the next day.

As a restricted free agent, Gettinger was re-signed to a one-year, two-way contract extension with the Rangers for the  season on July 22, 2022.

Career Statistics

Regular season and playoffs

International

References

External links

 

1998 births
Living people
American men's ice hockey left wingers
Hartford Wolf Pack players
New York Rangers draft picks
New York Rangers players
People from North Olmsted, Ohio
Ice hockey players from Ohio
Sault Ste. Marie Greyhounds players